Vyacheslav Yefimovich Malezhik (born 17 February 1947 in Moscow, Russia) is a Soviet and Russian singer, poet and composer, Meritorious Artist of Russian Federation (2004). He participated in various musical groups, but became most famous as a solo artist. Malezhik is married and has two sons.

References

External links
 Website

1947 births
Living people
Singers from Moscow
Soviet composers
Soviet male composers
Russian composers
Russian chanson
Russian male composers
Honored Artists of the Russian Federation
Soviet male singer-songwriters
Russian male singer-songwriters
20th-century Russian male singers
20th-century Russian singers